Moynalty is a village in the north-west of County Meath in Ireland. It was part of the Kells Poor Law Union. The Borora river flows through the village. Its population in 2011 was 116 people.

Origins of the name
According to the Annals of the Four Masters, the name Mágh nEalta was introduced into Ireland about 2000 BC when Partholon, a Greek, gave that name to a treeless fertile plain in Dublin. Because the description also described its location, the area now known as Moynalty got the name  also. The name was initially used to describe the manorial lands and settlement in the area.

The Synod of Kells in 1152 restructured Catholicism on Ireland, replacing a monastic system of directing the Irish Church with a system of parishes, dioceses and archdioceses.  As the old manorial village had embraced the name of the surrounding plain, the new parish assumed that name '' also.

Current village
The village was built by the grandson of James Farrell who purchased the lands of Moynalty and its hinterland in 1790. That grandson John Arthur completed the building of Moynalty Village in 1837 and it is to some extent based on a Swiss design. The village was built on one side only earning it the saying "All To One Side Like The Village Of Moynalty". It was only after 1900 that houses were built on the river side of the village.

The Donore Hoard of bronze artifacts, a bronze chain, plates, and a door knocker, decorated in an 8th-century style, were discovered in the townland of Donore, Moynalty during an excavation in 1984. The items have been housed in the National Museum of Ireland since June 1985.

There was a small lace-making industry in Moynalty. This lace making industry supplied Lace to the wife of King George at Buckingham Palace in London.  The village has become a familiar face in the national Tidy Towns competition. Moynalty was awarded with the title of Best Kept Town in All of Ireland in 2011. The village also hosts the Moynalty Steam Threshing festival, held every August since 1975.

Transport
Bus Éireann route 108 provides three journeys a day (one on Sundays) to Kells and three journeys a day (one on Sundays) to Bailieborough in County Cavan via Mullagh Onward connections to Dublin and Dublin Airport are available at Kells.

Notable people
Matthew Gilsenan - Member of the Irish-based classical music group The Celtic Tenors was born in Moynalty in the early 1970s.
Senator Patrick Lynch (1867–1944) - Born in Shearke, Moynalty in 1867.
Kevin Doyle - CEO 999 Australia

See also
 List of towns and villages in Ireland

References 

Towns and villages in County Meath
Planned communities in the Republic of Ireland